Carlos Alberto Alves Garcia (born 6 September 1982), commonly known as Carlitos, is a Portuguese professional footballer who plays as a left winger.

In his country, he played mainly with Estoril, but also won one Primeira Liga championship with Benfica. He spent most of his career in Switzerland, with Sion and Basel.

Club career

Early years
Born in Lisbon, Carlitos started his professional career at Amora F.C. in 2001, at the age of 19. Two years later he moved to neighbours G.D. Estoril Praia, helping it achieve promotion to the Primeira Liga in his second year.

Benfica
Subsequently, Carlitos caught the eye of S.L. Benfica, who signed the player after the 2004 UEFA European Under-21 Championship in Germany, where he appeared with Portugal. He helped Benfica conquer their first league title in 11 years, but could never break into the first team (ten games, nine as a reserve, none complete).

Vitória (loan)
In January 2006, Carlitos was loaned out to Vitória de Setúbal, making a good impression in six months.

Sion (loan)
In June, he returned to Benfica but was immediately loaned out again, this time to Swiss side FC Sion, teaming up with compatriot – of Benfica and FC Porto fame – João Manuel Pinto.

Basel
In January 2006, Carlitos was loaned out to Vitória de Setúbal, making a good impression in six months. In June, he returned to Benfica but was immediately loaned out again, this time to Swiss side FC Sion, teaming up with compatriot – of Benfica and FC Porto fame – João Manuel Pinto.

In July 2007, Carlitos was sold definitely but stayed in the country, moving to FC Basel for a fee of €1.5 million. He joined Basel's first team for their 2007–08 season under head coach Christian Gross. Carlitos played his domestic league debut for his new club in the home game in the St. Jakob-Park on 28 July 2007 as Basel played a 1–1 draw with Aarau. Basel played in the 2007–08 UEFA Cup. Carlitos scored his first goal for the team in the second leg of the qualification round, in the away game in the Pappelstadion on 30 August. It was the last goal of the game as Basel won 4–0 against SV Mattersburg (6-1 on aggregate) to qualify for the play-off round. Winning both matches in the qualification round and both matches in the play-off round, they advanced to the group stage. He scored the club's 200th goal in European competition on 5 December, curling the ball into the back of the net from a free kick against SK Brann, which also meant that Basel qualified for the round-of-32. They ended the group undefeated in second position, to continue the knockout stage. But then they were eliminated here by Sporting CP. Carlitos played in nine of the ten games, netting on five occasions. At the end of the 2007–08 season he won the Double with the club. They won the League Championship title with four points advantage over second placed Young Boys. In the Swiss Cup via FC Léchelles, SC Binningen, Grasshopper Club, Stade Nyonnais and in the semi-final Thun, Basel advanced to the final, and winning this 4–1 against AC Bellinzona they won the competition.

To the beginning of the 2008–09 season he was member of the Basel team that won the Uhrencup. They beat Legia Warsaw 6–1, Carlitos netted twice, and played a 2–2 draw with Borussia Dortmund to end the table on top slot above Dortmund and Luzern. Basel joined the 2008–09 UEFA Champions League in the second qualifying round and with an aggregate score of 5–3 they eliminated IFK Göteborg. In the next round they played against Vitória de Guimarães. The first leg ended in a goalless draw, but with a 2–1 win in the second leg they eliminated Vitória and advanced to the group stage. Here Basel were matched with Barcelona, Sporting CP and Shakhtar Donetsk, but ended the group in last position winning just one point after a 1–1 draw in Camp Nou. Carlitos played in nine of the ten games. At the end of the 2008–09 Super League season Basel were third in the table, seven points behind new champions Zürich and one adrift of runners-up Young Boys. In the 2008–09 Swiss Cup Basel advanced via Schötz, Bulle, Thun and Zurich to the semi-finals. But here they were stopped by YB. After a goalless 90 minutes and extra time, YB decided the penalty shoot-out 3–2 and advanced to the final to become runners-up, as Sion became cup winners.

Basel joined the 2009–10 UEFA Europa League in the second qualifying round. Basel advanced to the group stage, in which despite winning three of the six games the ended in third position and were eliminated. They finished four points behind group winners Roma and one behind Fulham, against whom they lost 3–2 in the last game of the stage. At the end of the 2009–10 season he won the Double with his club. They won the League Championship title with 3 points advantage over second placed Young Boys. In the Swiss Cup via SC Cham, FC Le Mont, Zürich, FC Biel-Bienne and in the semi-final SC Kriens, Basel advanced to the final, and winning this 6–0 against Lausanne-Sport they won the competition.

Carlitos left the club in August 2010 moving to Germany. During his time with the club, Carlitos played a total of 132 games for Basel scoring a total of 33 goals. 76 of these games were in the Swiss Super League, nine in the Swiss Cup, 26 in the UEFA competitions (Champions League, UEFA Cup and Europa League) and 21 were friendly games. He scored 11 goals in the domestic league, three in the cup, six in the European games and the other 13 were scored during the test games.

Hannover
On 1 August 2010, Carlitos moved to Germany and its Bundesliga by signing with Hannover 96 for an undisclosed fee. He made his debut on the 21st, retiring injured after three minutes in an eventual 2–1 home win against Eintracht Frankfurt; after being diagnosed with a tore cruciate ligament, he featured rarely until the end of his contract.

Later career
Carlitos returned to Portugal and its top division on 31 August 2012, re-joining former club Estoril. He scored his first goal for them in the competition on 9 February 2013 to close a 2–0 home victory over Vitória de Guimarães, adding six matches and one goal in the 2013–14 UEFA Europa League.

In the summer of 2014, Carlitos returned to Sion on a two-year deal. He prolonged his contract on two occasions.

Honours
Estoril
Segunda Liga: 2003–04

Benfica
Primeira Liga: 2004–05

Vitória Setúbal
Taça de Portugal runner-up: 2005–06

Basel
Swiss Super League: 2007–08, 2009–10
Swiss Cup: 2007–08, 2009–10

Sion
Swiss Cup: 2014–15

References

External links
Swiss Football League profile 

kicker profile 

1982 births
Living people
Portuguese sportspeople of Cape Verdean descent
Footballers from Lisbon
Portuguese footballers
Association football wingers
Primeira Liga players
Liga Portugal 2 players
Segunda Divisão players
Amora F.C. players
G.D. Estoril Praia players
S.L. Benfica footballers
S.L. Benfica B players
Vitória F.C. players
Swiss Super League players
FC Sion players
FC Basel players
Bundesliga players
Hannover 96 players
Portugal under-21 international footballers
Portuguese expatriate footballers
Expatriate footballers in Switzerland
Expatriate footballers in Germany
Portuguese expatriate sportspeople in Switzerland
Portuguese expatriate sportspeople in Germany
Portuguese people of Cape Verdean descent